

This is a list of the National Register of Historic Places listings in Philadelphia, Pennsylvania. There are more than 500 properties and districts listed on the National Register in Philadelphia, including 67 National Historic Landmarks.

Number of listings by district
The properties are distributed across all of Philadelphia's 12 planning districts. East/West Oak Lane, Olney, Upper North and Lower North are included as North Philadelphia. Kensington, Near Northeast and Far Northeast are part of Northeast Philadelphia. Roxborough/Manayunk and Germantown/Chestnut Hill are a part of Northwest Philadelphia.

See also

Philadelphia Register of Historic Places
List of Pennsylvania state historical markers in Philadelphia County
List of National Historic Landmarks in Philadelphia

References

External links
Historic Photographs of Philadelphia Historic Architectural Photos
Unofficial list for Philadelphia

Buildings and structures in Philadelphia
Philadelphia